Bilal Kısa (born 22 June 1983) is a Turkish retired professional footballer who played as a midfielder.

Professional career
On 10 May 2018, Bilal helped Akhisar Belediyespor win their first professional trophy, the 2017–18 Turkish Cup.

International career
On 29 March 2006, Kısa played his first national match when Turkey national team was playing against Estonia national team. He was reselected for the national team during the friendly clashes against Northern Ireland and Belarus in 2013.

International goals
Scores and results table list Turkey's goal tally first.

Club 
.

Playing style
Kısa is playing on a playmaker position generally with the assistance of two defensive midfielders. He is known with his technical moves and long range passes.

Honours

Galatasaray
Türkiye Kupası: 2015–16
Süper Kupa: 2015

Akhisarspor
Türkiye Kupası: 2017-18
Turkish Super Cup: 2018

References

External links

1983 births
Living people
People from Merzifon
Turkish footballers
Turkey international footballers
Turkey B international footballers
Turkey under-21 international footballers
Turkey youth international footballers
Fenerbahçe S.K. footballers
Süper Lig players
Ankaraspor footballers
Malatyaspor footballers
Kardemir Karabükspor footballers
Akhisarspor footballers
İzmirspor footballers
MKE Ankaragücü footballers
Karşıyaka S.K. footballers
Bursaspor footballers
Association football midfielders